Nixon v. Shrink Missouri Government PAC, 528 U.S. 377 (2000), was a case in which the Supreme Court of the United States held that their earlier decision in Buckley v. Valeo (1976), upholding federal limits on campaign contributions also applied to state limits on campaign contributions to state offices.

Background
Buckley v. Valeo established a "$1000 cap on individuals' contributions to candidates for federal office" in 1976. A 1998 statute increased the contribution limit to $1075 for statewide office candidates. In that year, Zev David Fredman filed suit alleging that "the Missouri statute imposing limits on contributions to candidates for state office violated" a candidates First and Fourteenth Amendment rights. Fredman further argued that he could only campaign effectively with contributions exceeding $1075. The Federal District Court upheld the statute on limitations to campaign donations. The Court of Appeals then reversed the decision finding that "Missouri's interest in avoiding the corruption or the perception of corruption caused by candidates' acceptance of large campaign contributions was insufficient to satisfy Buckly's strict scrutiny standard of review."

Decision of the Supreme Court
Justice John Paul Stevens' concurrence questioned more than two decades of campaign finance jurisprudence, stating:  "Money is property; it is not speech."

Professor D. Bruce La Pierre argued in front of the Court for the respondents. Patric Lester appeared on the brief. Missouri Attorney General Jay Nixon argued for the petitioners.

See also
 List of United States Supreme Court cases, volume 528
 List of United States Supreme Court cases
 Lists of United States Supreme Court cases by volume

References

External links
 

United States Supreme Court cases
United States Supreme Court cases of the Rehnquist Court
United States Free Speech Clause case law
2000 in United States case law
Legal history of Missouri